The Osaka Pro Wrestling Battle Royal Championship is a title contested in the Japanese pro wrestling promotion Osaka Pro Wrestling.  The title is won and lost in Battle Royals. The title was established in 2001 when Miracle Man won an 11-Man Battle Royal to become the first champion.

Being a professional wrestling championship, it is not won via direct competition; it is instead won via a predetermined ending to a match or awarded to a wrestler because of a wrestling angle. There have been 37 reigns by 20 wrestlers with three vacancies. One of the vacancies came when Black Buffalo vacated the title due to an injury.

Title history

List of combined reigns

References

External links

Battle Royal